Qezel Tappeh-ye Bayat (also Romanized as Qezel Tappeh-ye Bayāt and Qezel Tappeh Bayāt) is a village in Zanjanrud-e Bala Rural District, in the Central District of Zanjan County, Zanjan Province, Iran. At the 2006 census, its population was 299, in 67 families.

References 

Populated places in Zanjan County